Finch County is one of the 141 Cadastral divisions of New South Wales. It is bounded by the Narran River in the west, the Barwon River to the south and east, and the Queensland border to the north. It includes Lightning Ridge.

Finch County was named in honour of surveyor Heneage Finch, the grandson of Heneage Finch, 3rd Earl of Aylesford.

Parishes within this county
A full list of parishes found within this county; their current LGA and mapping coordinates to the approximate centre of each location is as follows:

References

Counties of New South Wales